"Enlightenment" is a single written by Northern Irish singer-songwriter Van Morrison and included on his 1990 album Enlightenment. The song was also included on the 1993 compilation album The Best of Van Morrison Volume Two.

Biographer Brian Hinton comments "'Enlightenment' is actually the opposite of what it sounds: it is full of doubt, not affirmation. 'I'm meditating and still I'm suffering.' He seems to be saying everything is a state of mind, you can choose to live in heaven or hell."

In a Rolling Stone review,  John Swenson writes that the album Enlightenment is a sequel to Avalon Sunset and enables Morrison to have a new start (musically and spiritually).  "Morrison is so pleased with his new start that he can even poke fun at his quest on the title track. 'I'm in the here and now and I'm meditating/And still I'm suffering but that's my problem,' he sings. 'Enlightenment, don't know what it is' – and he doesn't sound disturbed at all."

Personnel on original release
Van Morrison – vocals, harmonica
Bernie Holland – guitar
Georgie Fame — electric piano
Alex Gifford – synthesizers
Brian Odgers — bass guitar
Dave Early — drums

Notes

References
Hinton, Brian (1997). Celtic Crossroads: The Art of Van Morrison,  Sanctuary, 

1991 singles
1989 songs
Van Morrison songs
Songs written by Van Morrison
Polydor Records singles
Song recordings produced by Van Morrison